Parliamentary elections were held in Poland on 19 March 1972. The results, like with the other elections in communist Poland, were controlled by the communist government. The results of the 1965 election would be duplicated, exactly, by the 1969 and 1972 elections. The results of the next, 1976 election, would be only marginally different.

Results

As the other parties and "independents" were subordinate to PZPR, its control of the Sejm was total.

References

1972 in Poland
Parliamentary elections in Poland
Poland
March 1972 events in Europe
Elections in the Polish People's Republic
1972 elections in Poland